Bojan Pavlović (born 8 November 1986) is a Serbian professional footballer who plays as a goalkeeper for Bosnian Premier League club Borac Banja Luka.

Career statistics

Club

Honours
Makedonija Gjorče Petrov
Macedonian First League: 2008–09

Red Star Belgrade
Serbian Cup: 2009–10

Borac Banja Luka
Bosnian Premier League: 2020–21

References

External links
Bojan Pavlović at Sofascore

1986 births
Living people
Sportspeople from Loznica
Serbian footballers
Serbian expatriate footballers
Serbian SuperLiga players
Azerbaijan Premier League players
Liga Leumit players
Erovnuli Liga players
Premier League of Bosnia and Herzegovina players
FK Bežanija players
Red Star Belgrade footballers
FK Palilulac Beograd players
RFK Grafičar Beograd players
FK Radnički Pirot players
FK Makedonija Gjorče Petrov players
Qarabağ FK players
Hapoel Ashkelon F.C. players
OFK Beograd players
FC Zestafoni players
FK Sarajevo players
NK Čelik Zenica players
FK Borac Banja Luka players
Expatriate footballers in North Macedonia
Expatriate footballers in Azerbaijan
Expatriate footballers in Bosnia and Herzegovina
Association football goalkeepers